UniCare is an American health insurance company owned by Elevance Health.

Information

The company announced on October 28, 2021 that it was exiting the Illinois and Texas markets.

Records of the Texas Department of Insurance list UniCare Life & Health Insurance Company with a head office in Indianapolis, Indiana but a mailing address in Chicago, Illinois.

Health insurance

The company offers health insurance services through online health insurance brokers, such as HealthPlanOne and InsureMe.

References

External links
 

Companies based in Indianapolis
Insurance companies of the United States